Butch Patrick (born Patrick Alan Lilley; August 2, 1953) is an American actor and musician. Beginning his professional acting career at the age of seven, Patrick is perhaps best known for his role as child werewolf Eddie Munster on the CBS comedy television series The Munsters from 1964 to 1966 and in the 1966 feature film Munster, Go Home!, and as Mark on the ABC Saturday morning series Lidsville from 1971 to 1973.

Life and career
Patrick Alan Lilley was born on August 2, 1953, in Inglewood, California. He was spotted by a talent agent at the age of seven, which led to a series of appearances in television commercials and guest appearances on TV shows. In 1961 he made his feature-film debut in the 20th Century Fox comedy–fantasy The Two Little Bears, in which he co-starred with Eddie Albert and Jane Wyatt.

Over the next two years, Patrick went on to appear in guest-starring roles on numerous television series, including Ben Casey, Alcoa Premiere, Bonanza, My Favorite Martian, Gunsmoke, Mister Ed, and Rawhide and recurring roles on The Real McCoys and General Hospital. These roles would have him appear opposite headliners including Judy Garland, Burt Lancaster, and Sidney Poitier.

When recounting how he began his acting career, Patrick explained "I owe my career to my sister. She was the one who got me started and gave me all the encouragement. She always wanted to be an actress and was on the casting call sheet one day. She was asked if there were any other children at home. She told them about me, and I got some small roles, then some bigger ones..."

In 1964, Patrick landed the role of child werewolf Eddie Munster, starring alongside Fred Gwynne as Herman Munster, Yvonne De Carlo as Lily Munster and Al Lewis as Grandpa, on the CBS television series The Munsters, a fantasy situation comedy loosely based on Universal's movie monsters. The role of Eddie was originally portrayed by child actor Happy Derman in the pilot episode before Patrick was ultimately selected out of hundreds of boys for the role.

When asked how he landed the role of Eddie, Patrick recalled "I had a lot of experience. But maybe it was because my fangs were my own teeth. My teeth were so bad, that even when I closed my mouth they stuck out. I was about a head smaller than the other kids, and they liked that because it played off Herman's height." Living on the East Coast at the time, Patrick commuted to Los Angeles every week during filming of the series, appearing in 70 episodes during The Munsters two-season run from 1964 to 1966.

In an April 2017 interview, when asked if he recalled his TV mother (Yvonne De Carlo) hiding tiny portions of dialogue around the set, attaching them to props to help jog her memory, so the dialogue could be added to her performance: "No, not in The Munsters she wasn't doing that. Maybe later in life. Because sometimes your memory starts slipping on you. But that's a great idea, actually! I'll have to remember that!".

He also was asked if he had kept in touch with his on-screen family after The Munsters was canceled, especially De Carlo, who died on January 8, 2007. He replied, "No, after the show ended, everyone went their own ways. But in the early '80s, I contacted Al Lewis and we became friends and I started attaching myself to the Munster name and brand. And then 10 years after that I started talking to Yvonne. I was actually a guest on The Vicki Lawrence Show where I was this surprise guest brought out for Yvonne and after that we became friends. I started visiting her and she was somewhat of a recluse, living in North Los Angeles and I introduced her to this guy in Hollywood who would send her care packages, movies to watch and sort of get her back in the loop of Hollywood."

After The Munsters ended, Patrick continued to appear in guest-starring roles on various popular television series of the 1960s, including I Dream of Jeannie, Death Valley Days, Gunsmoke (1966's "Mad Dog"-S12E17), The Monkees, Daniel Boone, and Adam-12, as well as a recurring role as Gordon Dearing on the CBS family comedy series My Three Sons. During this time, Patrick also appeared in several Disney films, including Way Down Cellar, The Young Loner and The One and Only, Genuine, Original Family Band, as well as portraying the role of Milo in the 1970 MGM live-action/animated film The Phantom Tollbooth.

In 1971, Patrick landed the starring role on Sid and Marty Krofft's Saturday morning children's program Lidsville, broadcast on ABC. In the psychedelic fantasy series, Patrick portrayed Mark, a boy lost in a strange land of walking, talking, singing hats, opposite veteran character actors Charles Nelson Reilly and Billie Hayes. The show was in production from 1971 to 1973.

In 1975, Patrick left acting to work for his father and began to learn to play the bass guitar. In 1983, he recorded the song, "Whatever Happened To Eddie?" (b/w "Little Monsters"), with several instrumentalists and backup singers under the group name "Eddie and the Monsters." Set to the tune of the Munsters theme, the song details his life as a Munster. ("You might wonder why I have a dragon for a pet—well, he's just there to keep me company on the set.") In 2007 Patrick recorded a song "It's Only Halloween" that was released on Park Lane Drive Records.

In addition to his music, Patrick returned to occasional film and television work, including making cameo appearances as "Himself" on episodes of the Fox animated television series The Simpsons and the 2003 comedy film Dickie Roberts: Former Child Star, as well as appearing as a grown-up Eddie Munster in a Little Caesars Pizza commercial.

In 2002, Patrick co-hosted Macabre Theatre with Natalie Popovich aka "Ivonna Cadaver". That same year he also appeared in the first episode of the E! Network celebrity dating reality television show Star Dates.

Patrick made a cameo appearance in the 2005 retro-horror film Frankenstein vs. the Creature from Blood Cove, directed by William Winckler, playing a man who had become a werewolf, speaking a line of dialogue in comical reference to The Munsters.

Personal life
On September 11, 2016, Patrick married his longtime girlfriend Leila Murray.

Filmography

Film

Television

Music videos

References

External links

1953 births
Living people
American male child actors
American male film actors
American male television actors
Male actors from Los Angeles
Toy collectors